Çöhranlı (also, Cheyrany and Chovranly) is a village and municipality in the Kurdamir Rayon of Azerbaijan. Located in short distance from the Village are the Hərbi Hava Bazası Kürdəmir Airbase and the Kürdəmirli Hərbi Şəhərcik MIlitary Base.

References 

Populated places in Kurdamir District